Erkki Veikko Kuokkanen (5 December 1887, Kuopio – 6 March 1956) was a Finnish lawyer and politician. He served as Minister of the Interior from 4 July 1930 to 21 March 1931. Kuokkanen was a Member of the Parliament of Finland from 1927 to 1933, representing the National Coalition Party.

References

1887 births
1956 deaths
People from Kuopio
People from Kuopio Province (Grand Duchy of Finland)
National Coalition Party politicians
Government ministers of Finland
Members of the Parliament of Finland (1927–29)
Members of the Parliament of Finland (1929–30)
Members of the Parliament of Finland (1930–33)
20th-century Finnish lawyers
University of Helsinki alumni